Voz y Éxitos (Voice and Hits) is the first greatest hits album and the second in the United States of Colombian recording artist and actress Fanny Lu, released on November 30, 2012 by Universal Music Latino.

Track listing

References 

Fanny Lu compilation albums
2012 greatest hits albums
Spanish-language compilation albums
Universal Music Latino compilation albums
2013 greatest hits albums